The Dinosaurs of Santa Monica is a 1989 topiary sculpture series installed along the Third Street Promenade in Santa Monica, California. Featured are six dinosaurs made of stainless steel, copper, and plant materials: a triceratops measuring approximately 5 x 14 x 3 ft., a stegosaurus measuring approximately 6 x 14 x 3 ft., an apatosaurus measuring approximately 12 ft. x 34 ft. x 4 ft. 4 in., a diposocus measuring approximately 12 ft. x 35 ft. x 4 ft. 4 in., a dimetrodon (albeit not technically a dinosaur) measuring approximately 5 x 14 x 3 ft., and an igunodon measuring approximately 6 ft. x 14 ft. x 3 ft. 4 in. The series was surveyed by the Smithsonian Institution's 'Save Outdoor Sculpture!' program in 1994.

See also 

 Cultural depictions of dinosaurs
 Stegosaurus in popular culture

References 

1989 sculptures
Copper sculptures in the United States
Dinosaur sculptures
Outdoor sculptures in Santa Monica, California
Stainless steel sculptures in the United States
Steel sculptures in California